Sarah Elizabeth Cupp (born February 23, 1976) is an American television host, political commentator, and writer. In August 2017, she began hosting S.E. Cupp: Unfiltered, a political panel show, co-hosted by Andrew Levy, on HLN and later CNN.

She is a former panelist on the CNN political debate show Crossfire, author of Losing Our Religion: The Liberal Media's Attack on Christianity and co-author of Why You're Wrong About the Right. She was a panelist on Real News on TheBlaze, a co-host of the MSNBC talk show The Cycle, and a frequent guest host on the Fox News late night talk show Red Eye w/ Greg Gutfeld. She is a frequent guest panelist on Real Time with Bill Maher.

Early life 
Cupp was born in Oceanside, California. While growing up, she lived in Andover, Massachusetts, and attended the Academy of Notre Dame. From age six until her late teens, she studied ballet. While attending ballet school, she suffered from eating disorders and experienced a relapse during her college years. In 2000, Cupp graduated from Cornell University with a Bachelor of Arts degree in art history. While attending Cornell, she worked for The Cornell Daily Sun. In 2010, she earned a Master of Arts degree from the Gallatin School of Individualized Study at New York University with a concentration in religious studies.

Media career 
After graduating from Cornell, Cupp worked for an online magazine and a public relations company. She was also a contributor to Politico.com's The Arena and has been a frequent guest in the past on all three cable news channels – CNN, Fox News, and MSNBC.

Her writings have appeared in several publications, including The Washington Post, New York Daily News, The American Spectator, Townhall, Newsmax, Human Events, Slate, Maxim, and The Daily Caller.

In 2009, Cupp was hired as a columnist at the New York Daily News. In 2011, she was hired as a writer and commentator for Mercury Radio Arts, the organization owned and operated by Glenn Beck. Shortly after being hired by Beck, Cupp was given her show, "S.E. Cupp" on the Insider Extreme broadcast found on Glennbeck.com. The show was moved to GBTV (now TheBlaze TV).

On June 25, 2012, she began co-hosting The Cycle on MSNBC with political strategist Krystal Ball, pop-culture commentator Touré, and senior Salon political writer Steve Kornacki.

CNN announced on June 26, 2013, that Cupp would join a new version of Crossfire re-launching in the fall of 2013, with panelists Newt Gingrich, Stephanie Cutter, and Van Jones. Consequently, Cupp left MSNBC and The Cycle, following her final appearance on June 27, 2013.

On March 13, 2017, CNN's sister network, HLN, announced that Cupp would host a new evening program, S.E. Cupp Unfiltered, in June. In August 2018, the program moved to CNN as a weekly program on Saturday evenings.

Political views 
Although an atheist herself, on July 5, 2012, Cupp said on The Cycle that she "would never vote for an atheist president." When asked to explain, Cupp said she felt that a president must not represent only 10 to 15 percent of the American populace and that faith served as a "check" on presidential power.

In March 2013, Cupp pulled out of a CPAC appearance because of its stances on homosexuality and gay marriage, saying she "became increasingly uncomfortable [aligning] with an event, a great event in many ways, that had nonetheless attempted to marginalize a significant group of conservatives working on our behalf." She has since joined Young Conservatives for the Freedom to Marry.

Cupp, who identifies as a Log Cabin Republican, said the Republican Party should support gay marriage. She describes herself as a "mainstream conservative" but voted for Joe Biden and criticized Ron Paul's support for a non-interventionist foreign policy.

On August 20, 2020, Cupp announced that she would vote for Biden in the 2020 United States presidential election. 

In May 2022, Cupp supported upholding Roe v. Wade, stating that she is pro-life, but believes abortion should be legal.

Personal life 
For over twenty years, Cupp has been an atheist, but has consistently stated that she is open to theism, and once said in an interview with C-SPAN, "I really aspire to be a person of faith some day."

Cupp met John Goodwin, a former chief of staff to Representative Raúl Labrador, at the 2008 Republican Convention, and they began dating in 2011. She and Goodwin became engaged in September 2012, and were married in November 2013. She gave birth to a son, John Davies Goodwin III, in December 2014. Goodwin is currently head of communications for The Weather Channel.

Works

See also 
 New Yorkers in journalism

References

External links 

 
 

1979 births
Living people
American atheists
American ballerinas
American political commentators
American political writers
Boston Ballet dancers
California Republicans
CNN people
Cornell University alumni
Human Events people
American LGBT rights activists
Massachusetts Republicans
MSNBC people
New York Daily News people
New York University Gallatin School of Individualized Study alumni
People from Andover, Massachusetts
People from Carlsbad, California
Blaze Media people
The American Spectator people
21st-century atheists
Activists from California
Activists from Massachusetts